Mustafa Khalifa, also spelled as Moustafa Khalifa  (born in 1948) is a Syrian novelist, political writer, and topographer.

Early life
Khalifa was born in 1948 in Jarabulus,  Syria. He spent his childhood in Aleppo where he began to participate in political activities as a teenager. Consequently, he was sent to prison twice. Upon his release, Khalifa studied art and film direction in France, and was arrested at Damascus airport when he returned from Paris. From 1982-1994, Khalifa was held without trial at various state security prisons, including the infamous Tadmur Prison. The National Academy of Sciences reported that he was imprisoned for suspected involvement in the prohibited Party for Communist Action.  Amnesty International considered Khalifa to be a prisoner of conscience.

Works

Autobiographical novels

The Shell: Memoirs of a Hidden Observer
Khalifa's book The Shell: Memoirs of a Hidden Observer was in 2008 his first novel to be published. Joseph Sassoon has described the book as one of the "most powerful" Arabic memories on prison literature. Khalifa has stated that he considers his prison novel to be "a document and a testimony." Arab publishers were initially wary of printing the autobiographical novel, in which the main character, like the author, is imprisoned for thirteen years during Hafez al-Assad’s regime. However, the Franco-Syrian editor Farouk Mardam-Bey stepped in, releasing the book with the French publisher Actes Sud, having been translated into French by Stéphanie Dujols, entitled La Coquille: Prisonnier politique en Syrie. A year later the Arabic publisher Dar al-Adab in Beirut published the book in its original Arabic. The book was then translated into English by Paul Starkey and published by Interlink Books. It has also been translated into several other languages, including Italian and Spanish. In 2019 it was published in German, too.

Other works

What if Bashar Assad wins?
In 2012 Souria Houria published a paper by Khalifa entitled What if Bashar Assad wins? where the author considers a "hypothetical victory" of the Syrian regime. Khalifa considers what the implications would be on a domestic level, as well as on regional and international level, if the Syrian regime won over its people.

The impossible partition of Syria
In 2013 the Arab Reform Initiative published Khalifa's research paper entitled The impossible partition of Syria. Gary C. Gambill has described Khalifa's study as "an excellent discussion of demographic barriers to partition". In the study, Khalifa argues that the partition of Syria along sectarian boundaries would lead to disaster because it would fail to restore peace and will also be a danger for the stability of neighboring countries. Khalifa maps the ethnic and sectarian composition of Syrian society, and also discusses Syria's economy, to try to determine when and how fragmentation might occur. He argues that these factors had led to the failure of partition in 1922, which would have given the Alawites control over a smaller state, therefore, the partition of Syria remains an "impossible" prospect.

Awards
The Ibn Rushd Prize for Freedom of Thought in 2015

Personal life
Khalifa is married to the activist Sahar al-Bunni who is the sister of the political activists Akram al-Bunni and Anwar al-Bunni.

Exile
Although he was banned from travelling outside Syria, in 2006 Khalifa emigrated to the United Arab Emirates, and then he moved to France – where he continues to live today.

References

1948 births
Living people
Syrian filmmakers
Syrian novelists
Syrian topographers